Olivier Martinet (XVIIe - ?) was an 18th-century French architect of the .

Life

Origin 
He was the son of Jean Martinet and Renée Bellier (the Belliers were linked to several architects). He was also affiliated to the Langlois family.

Architect 

One evening of the 1645 Fête-Dieu, at the end of the suburb of Saint-Martin de Laval, a fight took place between Jean-Michel Langlois and Olivier Martinet on one side and the architects François and Pierre Vignier on the other, but the complaint was withdrawn, and they reconciled. Another time, in 1666, François Langlois was accused of wounding Jacques Chevreul, master locksmith, in a quarrel.

In 1650, he built an altar at Saint-Colomban Church in Quimperlé. In 1653, he is at Port-Louis where he built the altars of the Church of Our Lady.

On May 31, 1655, he lived in Hennebont, and came to Laval to settle his marble scores with Michel Rochereau. At the same time, he erected three retables lavallois in Séglien, Ploërdut and Locmalo.

He then erected an altar in a side chapel of the Dominican Church of Rennes. He then returned to Port-Louis, where the work seemed episodic. It was probably at the same time that he was raising the main altar and two side altarpieces in the church of Carnac, that he finished in 1659.

From 1668 to 1670 or 1672, he built an altarpiece at the Église Saint-Jean-Baptiste de Saint-Jean-du-Doigt. Jacques Salbert thinks that an altarpiece was built in the chapel of the Château du Taureau, and that the rest of the material was used to build the altarpiece of Guingamp.

In 1672, he worked on the construction of the main altar of the Abbaye de Beauport. In 1679, Martinet made the altarpiece of Tressignaux, then probably also in Guingamp in 1680. The altarpiece of Bréhat is also attributed  to Olivier Martinet.

References

Bibliography 
 Jules-Marie Richard, Les constructeurs de retables, 1906.
 Jacques Salbert, Ateliers de retabliers Lavallois aux XVIIe et XVIIIe siècles: Études historiques et artistiques, Presses Universitaires de Rennes, 1976.

Date of birth missing
Place of birth missing
Date of death missing
Place of death missing
17th-century French architects